{{DISPLAYTITLE:C21H25N3O}}
The molecular formula C21H25N3O (molar mass: 335.44 g/mol) may refer to:

 ECPLA (N-ethyl-N-cyclopropyllysergamide)
 LSD-Pip
 Lysergic acid 2,4-dimethylazetidide

Molecular formulas